The Art Gallery of the University of Southern Maine, Gorham campus, is located at 5 University Way, at the main campus entrance.  The building in which it is located was built in 1822 as a non-denominational church building, and has also served as Gorham's town hall.  It has been part of the campus since the early 1960s, and was listed on the National Register of Historic Places in 1972.

Description and history
The Art Gallery is located at the southern edge of the USM Gorham campus, at the northeast corner of University Way and College Avenue, west of the Gorham town center. The front, facing south, is distinguished by a temple facade, with four fluted Doric columns supporting an entablature and fully pedimented gable. The gable has a small rectangular opening at its center, that originally housed a window but is now boarded over. The facade behind the temple front has two sash windows flanking a central entrance. The side walls have six evenly spaced windows.

The building was constructed in 1822, primarily to provide a performance venue for the local Handel Society, a singing group that provided music to religious groups that met in the space.  It was used in this capacity until 1844, when it was auctioned off.  Toppan Robie, a prominent local businessman, won the auction, and promptly gave the building to the town.  In return he was given the town's old town hall, and a stipulation that the building would return to his (or his heirs') ownership if it ceased to be used for town functions.  The town used it for town meetings until 1960, at which time it reverted to the Robie heirs.  They promptly donated the building to the state.  It has since been adapted by the university for use as an art gallery.

See also
National Register of Historic Places listings in Cumberland County, Maine

References

External links
University of Southern Maine Art Galleries

University and college buildings on the National Register of Historic Places in Maine
Buildings and structures completed in 1821
Town halls in Maine
Churches in Maine
Art museums and galleries in Maine
Buildings at the University of Southern Maine
National Register of Historic Places in Cumberland County, Maine
Historic district contributing properties in Maine
University and college buildings completed in 1821
1821 establishments in Maine